La Maragatería or País de los Maragatos (Tierra de Maragatos in Leonese language), is an ancient historical region or traditional comarca in the landlocked Province of León, Spain. It borders with La Cepeda comarca in the north, La Valduerna in the south, with the comarcas of El Bierzo and La Cabrera in the west and southwest, and in the east with La Vega del Tuerto and La Valduerna.

La Maragatería encompasses lesser comarcas, like the Alta Maragatería, Baja Maragatería and the Somoza Comarca. Its inhabitants are known as "Maragatos".
Leonese language is widely used in this shire.

Municipalities
The main municipalities making up the comarca are:
 Astorga, the main town
 Brazuelo
 Lucillo
 Luyego
 Santa Colomba de Somoza
 Santiago Millas
 Val de San Lorenzo

Culture
The Maragatos form a small ethnic and cultural community with distinctive customs and architecture. The Maragata women used to wear a striking regional dress that made them stand out when they travelled to other parts of Spain.

Cocido Maragato (Cocíu maragatu in Leonese language) is a traditional local soup dish with meat.

Tierra de Maragatos has its own traditional way of building stone houses with large doors. Some of them have been preserved.

See also
 Astorga
 Comarca de La Cabrera
Mantecadas

References

External links 

Maragatos en el recuerdo
La esfinge maragata Old movie showing traditional dresses and dances
 Astorga y la Maragateria
 La comarca de la Maragatería
 La página web del cocido maragato
La Maragatería y Cepeda